are detribalized Native Americans who, by war or payment of ransom, were taken into Hispano and Puebloan villages as indentured servants, shepherds, general laborers, etc., in Santa Fe de Nuevo México in New Spain, which is modern New Mexico, southern Colorado, and other parts of the Southwestern United States. 

New Spain had a prohibition of indigenous slavery implemented from 1543 onwards, but it excluded those captured in the context of war. The restrictions of slavery also meant that  were to be convicted and sentenced to servitude for a specific timespan, at which time they earned freedom. They were even encouraged to become landowners themselves by Spanish government landgrants, or to join the regional militia. After abolition of slavery was proposed in 1810 during Mexican independence, the practice of slavery began to become unpopular in the Spanish Empire, even more so after abolition was included officially by José María Morelos in the Sentimientos de la Nación of 1813.

 settled in several New Mexican villages, such as Belén, Tomé, Valencia, Carnuel, Los Lentes, Las Trampas, Socorro, and San Miguel del Vado.  also lived in Albuquerque, Bernalillo, Atrisco, Santa Fe, Chimayó, Taos, Abiquiú, and Las Vegas, NM. Most  were, or their ancestors had been, slaves of Indian tribes, particularly the Plains tribes who raided and enslaved members of tribes allied with the Spaniards, such as the Apaches.

By the end of the 18th century,  were estimated to comprise about one third of the entire population of New Mexico which in 1793 was 29,041. In 2007,  and their contemporary descendants were recognized as indigenous people by the New Mexico Legislature. During the early 21st century, they have comprised much of the population of the South Valley of Albuquerque, and significant portions of the population of northern New Mexico, including Española, Taos, Santa Fe, Las Vegas, in addition to that of southern Colorado.

Name
The term  is a Spanish word borrowed from the Italian word , which was adopted from the Ottoman Turkish word . This Turkish word referred to slaves who were trained as soldiers for the Ottoman Empire. (The Turkish word was also adopted into English as "janissary"). The first known use of the word  in New Mexico was during the early 1660s when a politician was accused of mistreating a  servant, whose father was a Pueblo and whose mother was Apache-Quivira (Wichita). The term became used generally after 1692 when the Spanish regained control of New Mexico after the Pueblo revolt.

The word  also had a military meaning in New Mexico.  militia and scouts were important in defending New Mexico from raiding Comanche, Apache, and Navajo warriors. The  were organized formally in 1808 into a  Troop, commanded by a corporal from their ranks and with a supply system dedicated for them.

History

 were typically indigenous Indians who had been captured and enslaved by other Indian tribes and whom Franciscan monks were obligated legally to rescue by paying ransom. The former slaves were made indentured servants in order to repay such debt, typically for a period of a number of years.

During the late 1700s and early 1800s,  comprised a significant proportion of the population of what is now the southwest United States. They founded a number of localities, such as Belén, Tomé, Valencia, Carnué, Los Lentes, Las Trampas, Socorro and San Miguel del Vado. There were also  in towns such as Albuquerque, Atrisco, Santa Fe, Chimayó, Taos, Abiquiú and Las Vegas.

The debt of a ransomed Indian, often a child, was usually 10 to 20 years of service to the person paying the ransom. Young women were especially prized. The experience of most ransomed Indians—- a —- was "bondage on a continuum that ranged from near slavery to familial incorporation, but few shed the stigma of servility". Descendants of  typically were also considered . But, as in the case of the rest of colonial Mexico, this classification was not an absolute impediment to social mobility.

The Comanche and other tribes brought their captives to trade fairs and offered them for sale.  In 1770, a female captive from 12 to 20 years old sold for two good horses and some small items; a male was worth only one-half as much. 

Many of the  complained of mistreatment by the Spanish. Based on a policy established by the Governors of New Mexico, they were settled in land grants on the periphery of Spanish settlements. These settlements became buffer communities for larger Spanish towns in the event of attack by the enemy tribes surrounding the province.  The  in the frontier communities become mediators between the often-hostile Indian tribes surrounding the Spanish settlements and the Spanish authorities. 

The following description from the 1740s of the Tome-Valencia settlements by a Spanish religious official, Fray Menchero, describes  and their settlement on land grants:
"This is a new settlement, composed of various nations [tribes], who are kept in peace, union, and charity by the special providence of God and the efforts of the missionaries,... the Indians are of the various nations that have been taken captive by the Comanche Apaches, a nation so bellicose and so brave that it dominates all those of the interior country...They sell people of all these nations to the Spaniards of the kingdom, by whom they are held in servitude, the adults being instructed by the fathers and the children baptized. It sometimes happens that the Indians are not well treated in this servitude, no thought being given to the hardships of their captivity, and still less to the fact that they are neophytes, and should be cared for and treated with kindness. For this reason many desert and become apostates. 

The settlements of Tomé and Belén, just south of Albuquerque, were described by Juan Agustín Morfi as follows in 1778: 
"In all the Spanish towns of New Mexico there exists a class of Indians called genízaros. These are made up of captive Comanches, Apaches, etc. who were taken as youngsters and raised among us, and who have married in the province…They are forced to live among the Spaniards, without lands or other means to subsist except the bow and arrow which serves them when they go into the back country to hunt deer for food… They are fine soldiers, very warlike… Expecting the genízaros to work for daily wages is a folly because of the abuses they have experienced, especially from the alcaldes mayores in the past… In two places, Belen and Tome, some sixty families of genizaros have congregated."

Tribal origins
According to DNA studies, Hispanos of New Mexico have significant proportions of Amerindian genes (between 30 and 40% of the Nuevomexicano genome) due to the interbreeding between Spanish and genízaros. Most  were Navajo, Pawnee, Apache, Kiowa Apache, Ute, Comanche, and Paiute, who had been purchased at a young age and worked as domestic servants and sheepherders. Throughout the Spanish and Mexican period,  settled in several New Mexican villages such as Belén, Tomé, Valencia, Carnuel, Los Lentes, Socorro, and San Miguel del Vado.   also lived in Albuquerque, Atrisco, Santa Fe, Chimayó, Taos, Abiquiú, and Las Vegas, NM.

By the mid-18th century, the Comanche dominated the weaker tribes in the eastern plains and sold children that they kidnapped from these tribes to the Spanish villagers. During negotiations with the United States military, Navajo spokesmen raised the issue of Navajos being held as servants in Spanish/Mexican households. When asked how many Navajos were among the Mexicans, they responded: "over half the tribe". Most of the captives never returned to the Navajo nation but remained as the lower classes in the Hispanic villages. Members of different tribes intermarried in these communities.

Presently their descendants comprise much of the population of Atrisco, Pajarito, and Barelas in the South Valley of Albuquerque, and significant portions of the population of Las Vegas in Eastern New Mexico.

19th century
In 1821, Mexico became independent of Spain, and New Mexico became a territory within the First Mexican Empire. The Treaty of Córdoba enacted by Mexico decreed that indigenous tribes within its borders were citizens of Mexico. During Spanish rule,  and Pueblo natives had often been treated as second-class citizens, although they were protected by the Laws of the Indies. 

During this period, use of the term  was ended officially for church and government documents. In practice, however, Mexico was far from egalitarian. Many  remained culturally and economically marginal in New Mexican society.

Economic and social conditions during the Mexican period were so bad that in 1837, the Pueblo, coyotes, and  revolted against the Mexican government. Rebels beheaded Albino Perez (the Governor of New Mexico), and killed all of the Mexican troops in Santa Fe. The revolt was often referred to as the Chimayoso Revolt, after the community of Chimayó in northern New Mexico, which was home to José Ángel González and many other mixed-blood indigenous peoples. The Chimayoso revolt was one of many against the Mexican government by indigenous groups during this period, which included the Mayan revolt in Yucatán.

Notes

See also 

 Mission Indians

References

Further reading 
 
 
 
 
 
 
 
 
 
 
 
 
 {{cite book|title     = Statement of Mr. Head of Abiquiú in Regard of the Buying and Selling of Payutahs, 30 April 1852|work      = Doc. no. 2150|publisher = Huntington Library|series    = Ritch Collection of Papers Pertaining to New Mexico|location  = San Marino, California|last1     = Lafayette}}
 
 Pinart Collection, PE 52:28, Governor Tomás Vélez Cachupín, Decree'', Santa Fe, 24 May 1766; PE 55:3, 1790 Census for Abiquiú.

External links
Indio-Hispano Legacy

Multiracial affairs in the United States
Native American history of New Mexico
Indigenous peoples in Mexico
Mestizo
Slavery of Native Americans
Latin American caste system
Mexican slaves
Colonial New Mexico
Indigenous Mexican American
Neomexicanos
Ethno-cultural designations